Simitidion agaricographum is a species of comb-footed spider in the family Theridiidae. It is found in the Mediterranean.

References

Theridiidae
Spiders described in 1982
Spiders of North Africa
Spiders of Western Asia
Spiders of Europe